Mame Mor Diouf (born 16 August 1988) is a Senegalese professional footballer.

Career
Diouf began his career with AS Douanes and joined South African club Maritzburg United in 2009. In 2012, he joined SuperSport United. In March 2013, he scored an 88th-minute winning goal from  against Mamelodi Sundowns which was chosen as South Africa's goal of the season.

References

1988 births
Living people
Footballers from Dakar
Serer sportspeople
Senegalese footballers
Senegalese expatriate footballers
Expatriate soccer players in South Africa
Senegalese expatriate sportspeople in South Africa
Association football defenders
AS Douanes (Senegal) players
Maritzburg United F.C. players
SuperSport United F.C. players
Mbour Petite-Côte FC players
Senegal A' international footballers
2009 African Nations Championship players